Aleksandr Sheff (Russian: Александр Шефф; born 1931) is a Russian rower who represented the Soviet Union. He competed at the 1956 Summer Olympics in Melbourne with the men's coxless four where they were eliminated in the semi-final.

References

External links 
 
 
 

1931 births
Possibly living people
Russian male rowers
Olympic rowers of the Soviet Union
Rowers at the 1956 Summer Olympics